Kwon Soon-woo (born 2 December 1997) is a South Korean professional tennis player. He has been ranked as high as world No. 52 ranking by the Association of Tennis Professionals (ATP), which he first achieved in November 2021. He also has a career-high doubles ranking of world No. 227, attained in October 2022. Since turning professional in 2015, Kwon has won two ATP, three ATP Challenger Tour and five ITF World Tennis Tour singles titles. 

He broke into the top 100 of the ATP singles rankings in August 2019 after reaching the quarterfinals at the Los Cabos Open and contested his first ATP Tour final at the Astana Open in September 2021, where he won his maiden title and made his top 60 debut. In January 2023, he won his second ATP Tour title at the Adelaide International as a lucky loser, becoming the first Korean to win multiple ATP titles.

Early life
Kwon was born in a small town Sangju and began playing tennis at age 10. He moved to Seoul at age 16 and attended high school there with Lee Duck-hee, another future ATP Tour player. His father Younghun is a talented amateur tennis player and introduced him to tennis. His favorite surface is hard and favorite shots are down-the-line forehand and drop shot.

Professional career

2018–2019: ATP Tour & Grand Slam & top 100 debuts
Kwon made his tour-level and Grand Slam debut after winning the 2018 Asia-Pacific Wildcard Playoff for the main draw of the 2018 Australian Open.

He made his top 100 debut on 5 August 2019 at world No. 97, after reaching the quarterfinals as a qualifier at the 2019 Los Cabos Open.

2020–2021: First major win at the US Open; French Open third round, maiden ATP title

In February 2020, Kwon reached four consecutive ATP Tour-level quarterfinals in Pune, New York, Delray Beach and Acapulco. As a result, Kwon rose to a career-high ranking of 69 on 2 March 2020. Kwon defeated world No. 24, Dušan Lajović, in straight sets to reach the quarterfinals in Acapulco, which was his first ATP 500 event. He lost to eventual champion Rafael Nadal in the quarterfinals.

At the 2020 US Open Kwon recorded his first win in a Grand Slam defeating wildcard Thai-Son Kwiatkowski.

Kwon reached the third round of a Grand Slam for the first time in his career at the 2021 French Open where he defeated South African Kevin Anderson and Andreas Seppi before losing to another Italian ninth seed and eventual quarterfinalist Matteo Berrettini.

Despite losing in qualifying at the Eastbourne International, Kwon entered with a second-round bye as a lucky loser after Reilly Opelka withdrew. He made the semifinals before falling to Alex de Minaur. Kwon was competing in his maiden ATP Tour semifinal after winning his first quarterfinal in his eighth attempt against Ilya Ivashka.

In Astana, Kwon won his first ATP Tour-level title. There, he defeated qualifier Evgeny Donskoy, third seed Dušan Lajović, and seventh seed Laslo Đere to reach his second ATP semifinal. In the semifinal, he defeated home favourite and second seed Alexander Bublik to advance to his first ATP Tour-level final. He defeated James Duckworth in straight sets to win his first ATP title and became the first South Korean to win on the ATP Tour and only the second Korean to win a tour-level title in the Open era since 2003 Sydney champion Hyung-Taik Lee. As a result, he reached a new career-high of No. 57 on 27 September 2021.

2022: Maiden ATP 500 singles semifinal, Australian Open doubles third round 
At the Australian Open, he won his first match defeating Holger Rune in five sets. He lost in the second round to Denis Shapovalov in a tight five-set match with three tiebreaks. 

At Wimbledon, he lost in the first round to the top seed and eventual champion, Novak Djokovic, in four sets.

Ranked No. 120 at the Japan Open, he reached the quarterfinals for a second time at the ATP 500-level defeating sixth seed Alex de Minaur and Mackenzie McDonald. He defeated Pedro Martinez to reach his first ATP 500-level semifinal. As a result, he moved more than 30 positions up in the rankings, back into the top 100.

2023: Second title won as lucky loser
He won his second career ATP title in Adelaide, defeating Roberto Bautista Agut in three sets. In doing so, he became the first Korean to win multiple ATP titles. He became the first lucky loser to reach the final in Adelaide's tournament history and the first to win an ATP Tour title since Marco Cecchinato in Budapest in 2018.

National representation
Kwon has represented South Korea in the Davis Cup. He was first nominated to the team for the 2017 Davis Cup, making his debut against Uzbek tennis player Denis Istomin.

Kwon represented South Korea at the 2022 Davis Cup Finals and recorded his first victory over a top-20 player by defeating world No. 13, Felix Auger-Aliassime 7–6(5), 6–3 in the group stage tie versus Canada.

Performance timelines

Singles
Current through the 2023 ABN AMRO Open.

Doubles
Current through the 2022 Korea Open.

ATP career finals

Singles: 2 (2 titles)

Records
 These records were attained in the Open era of tennis.

Davis Cup

   indicates the outcome of the Davis Cup match followed by the score, date, place of event, the zonal classification and its phase, and the court surface.

Challenger and Futures finals

Singles: 11 (8–3)

Doubles: 6 (2–4)

Head-to-head records

Record against top 10 players
Kwon's record against players who have been ranked in the top 10, with those who are active in boldface. Only ATP Tour main draw and Davis Cup matches are considered:

Record against players ranked No. 11–20
Active players are in boldface. 

  Reilly Opelka 0–2
  Kyle Edmund 0–1
  Guido Pella 0–3
 Albert Ramos-Viñolas 0–1
 Nikoloz Basilashvili 0–1
 Alex de Minaur 1–1
 Benoit Paire 2–1
 Frances Tiafoe 0–2
 Tommy Paul 0–1
*

ITF World Tennis Tour Juniors

Singles: 5 (4 titles, 1 runner-up)

Doubles: 6 (3 titles, 3 runners-up)

References

External links
 
 
 

1997 births
Living people
South Korean male tennis players
Tennis players at the 2020 Summer Olympics
Tennis players at the 2018 Asian Games
Asian Games competitors for South Korea
Olympic tennis players of South Korea
People from Sangju
21st-century South Korean people